Peter Clive Sarnak  (born 18 December 1953) is a South African-born mathematician with dual South-African and American nationalities. Sarnak has been a member of the permanent faculty of the School of Mathematics at the Institute for Advanced Study since 2007. He is also Eugene Higgins Professor of Mathematics at Princeton University since 2002, succeeding Andrew Wiles, and is an editor of the Annals of Mathematics. He is known for his work in analytic number theory. He also sits on the Board of Adjudicators and the selection committee for the Mathematics award, given under the auspices of the Shaw Prize.

Education
Sarnak is the grandson of one of Johannesburg's leading rabbis and lived in Israel for three years as a child. He graduated from the University of the Witwatersrand (BSc 1975, BSc(Hons) 1976) and Stanford University (PhD 1980), under the direction of Paul Cohen. Sarnak's highly cited work (with A. Lubotzky and R. Phillips) applied deep results in number theory to Ramanujan graphs, with connections to combinatorics and computer science.

Career and research
Sarnak has made major contributions to analysis and number theory. He is widely recognised internationally as one of the leading analytic number theorists of his generation. His early work on the existence of cusp forms led to the disproof of a conjecture of Atle Selberg. He has obtained the strongest known bounds towards the Ramanujan–Petersson conjectures for sparse graphs, and he was one of the first to exploit connections between certain questions of theoretical physics and analytic number theory. There are fundamental contributions to arithmetical quantum chaos, a term which he introduced, and to the relationship between random matrix theory and the zeros of L-functions. His work on subconvexity for Rankin–Selberg L-functions led to the resolution of Hilbert's eleventh problem. During his career he has held numerous appointments including:
Assistant Professor, 1980–83; Associate Professor, 1983; Professor, 2001–2005, Courant Institute, New York University
Associate Professor, 1984–87; Professor, 1987–91, Stanford University
Professor, 1991–; H. Fine Professor, 1995–96; Chairman, Dept of Mathematics, 1996–99; Eugene Higgins Professor, 2002–, Princeton University
Member, 1999–2002 and 2005–2007; Faculty, 2007–, Institute for Advanced Study

Publications

Some Applications of Modular Forms, 1990
(joint editor) Extremal Riemann Surfaces, 1997
 (joint author) Random Matrices, Frobenius Eigenvalues and Monodromy, 1998

 (joint editor) Selected Works of Ilya Piatetski-Shapiro (Collected Works), 2000
(joint author) Elementary Number Theory, Group Theory and Ramanujan Graphs, 2003
 (joint editor) Selected Papers Volume I-Peter Lax, 2005
 (joint editor) Automorphic Forms and Applications, 2007

Awards and honours
Peter Sarnak was awarded the Pólya Prize of the Society for Industrial & Applied Mathematics in 1998, the Ostrowski Prize in 2001, the Levi L. Conant Prize in 2003, the Frank Nelson Cole Prize in Number Theory in 2005 and a Lester R. Ford Award in 2012. He is the recipient of the 2014 Wolf Prize in Mathematics. 
The University of the Witwatersrand conferred an honorary doctorate on Professor Peter Sarnak on 2 July 2014 for his distinguished contribution to the field of mathematics.

He was an invited speaker at the International Congress of Mathematicians (ICM) in 1990 in Kyoto and a plenary speaker at the ICM in 1998 in Berlin.

He was also elected as member of the National Academy of Sciences (USA) and Fellow of the Royal Society (FRS) in 2002. He became a member of the American Philosophical Society in 2008. He was awarded an honorary doctorate by the Hebrew University of Jerusalem in 2010. He was also awarded an honorary doctorate by the University of Chicago in 2015. He was elected to the 2018 class of fellows of the American Mathematical Society. In 2019 he became the 10th non-British citizen to ever be awarded the Sylvester Medal of the Royal Society.

References

1953 births
Living people
People from Johannesburg
University of the Witwatersrand alumni
South African mathematicians
South African emigrants to the United States
20th-century American mathematicians
21st-century American mathematicians
Institute for Advanced Study faculty
Courant Institute of Mathematical Sciences faculty
Princeton University faculty
Stanford University alumni
Stanford University Department of Mathematics faculty
Fellows of the American Mathematical Society
Fellows of the Royal Society
Members of Academia Europaea
Members of the United States National Academy of Sciences
Wolf Prize in Mathematics laureates
Mathematical physicists
Number theorists
Members of the American Philosophical Society